Randall Scott Lewis (born June 7, 1959, in Rapid City, South Dakota) is an American wrestler and Olympic champion. He competed at the 1984 Olympic Games in Los Angeles, where he won the gold medal in freestyle wrestling in the featherweight class. 

Lewis won three high school state wrestling titles in South Dakota. At one point in his high school career, Lewis held the national consecutive pin record at 45. He later won the Junior World (20 years old and younger) Freestyle Championship.

In college, Lewis became a four-time All-American and two-time NCAA champion at the University of Iowa. He was a two-time Olympian, in both 1980 and 1984. President Jimmy Carter's boycott prevented the U.S. team from traveling to the 1980 Olympic Games held in Moscow, Russia. At the 1984 Olympic Games, Lewis won the gold medal at the 62 kg weight division in freestyle wrestling, outscoring his first four opponents 52-4 to advance to the final, where he defeated Japan's Kosei Akaishi 24-11 in 4:52.

He was second in the 1988 U.S. Olympic trials to John Smith, losing out in a best of three series. Smith went on to capture Olympic gold in both the 1988 and 1992 Games.

In 1998, Lewis was inducted into the National Wrestling Hall of Fame as a Distinguished Member.

References

External links

1959 births
Living people
Sportspeople from Rapid City, South Dakota
Iowa Hawkeyes wrestlers
Wrestlers at the 1984 Summer Olympics
American male sport wrestlers
Olympic gold medalists for the United States in wrestling
Medalists at the 1984 Summer Olympics
Pan American Games medalists in wrestling
Pan American Games gold medalists for the United States
Wrestlers at the 1983 Pan American Games
Medalists at the 1983 Pan American Games
20th-century American people
21st-century American people